Nthokozo Tshuma (born 29 October 1985) is a retired Zimbabwean football midfielder.

References

1985 births
Living people
Zimbabwean footballers
Hwange Colliery F.C. players
F.C. Platinum players
How Mine F.C. players
Zimbabwe international footballers
Association football midfielders
Zimbabwe Premier Soccer League players
Sportspeople from Bulawayo